Ann Ayars (23 July 1918 – 27 February 1995) was an American soprano and actress. Early in her career she acted in several TV series and non musical films. Later, she sang with the New York City Opera (NYCO), and became known worldwide when she sang and acted the part of Antonia in the 1951 British film The Tales of Hoffmann.

From 1968 to 1987 she taught voice and piano and staged 19 full-length opera productions at Mt. San Jacinto College in California, where she was made a professor emerita.

Biography
Ann Ayars was born on 23 July 1918 in Beverly Hills, California. She began as a singer in the late 1930s and started acting in the early 1940s. She had parts in several television series, including Batman, Hazel, Mission: Impossible, The Alfred Hitchcock Hour, Perry Mason, The Virginian and The Monroes.

She starred as Cholita in the 1941 film Fiesta and in 1942 she was Cynthia Cookie Charles in Dr. Kildare's Victory. Also in 1942, she appeared as Constance Selden in Apache Trail, Kaaren de Relle in Nazi Agent and Juliette in Reunion in France. In 1943 she was Mrs Sandoval in The Human Comedy and Susan Thayer in The Youngest Profession.

She left Hollywood in 1943 to join the newly formed New York City Opera, becoming its leading lyric soprano. Her operatic roles included Monica in The Medium, Mimi in La bohème and Violetta in La traviata. Her friend, mezzo-soprano Frances Bible, said "Her work with the opera has inspired many young singers, many of whom went on to professional careers."

Courtesy of MGM, Ayars helped entertain the troops in February 1944 at Camp Roberts, California, starring in Rio Rita along with Janis Paige.

She had a star part as Antonia in the 1951 Powell and Pressburger film The Tales of Hoffmann, which was based on the opéra fantastique by Jacques Offenbach. Although all the parts in the film are sung, only Robert Rounseville (Hoffmann) and Ayars sang their own parts, the others being dubbed.

In 1968 she returned to California and took a post teaching voice and piano at Mt. San Jacinto College in San Jacinto, California, where she staged 19 full-length opera productions.

She retired in 1987. On 27 February 1995 she died at her home in Hemet in Riverside County following complications from diabetes.

References

External links

 

1918 births
1995 deaths
20th-century American actresses
20th-century American singers
American operatic sopranos
Actresses from Beverly Hills, California
People from Hemet, California
20th-century American women singers
Singers from California
Classical musicians from California